Shebalino is the name of several rural localities in Russia:
Shebalino, Altai Krai, a selo in Shebalinsky Selsoviet of Biysky District of Altai Krai
Shebalino, Altai Republic, a selo in Shebalinskoye Rural Settlement of Shebalinsky District of the Altai Republic
Shebalino, Volgograd Oblast, a khutor in Shebalinovsky Selsoviet of Oktyabrsky District of Volgograd Oblast